Luis Armando Melgar Bravo (born 21 August 1966) is a Mexican politician affiliated with the PVEM. He currently serves as Senator of the LXII Legislature of the Mexican Congress representing Chiapas. He also was director of the TV station Proyecto 40 between 2006 and 2011.

He was elected deputy for Thirteenth Federal Electoral District of Chiapas at the 2021 Mexican legislative election.

See also 

 LXIII Legislature of the Mexican Congress
 LXV Legislature of the Mexican Congress

References

1966 births
Living people
Politicians from Chiapas
Ecologist Green Party of Mexico politicians
Members of the Senate of the Republic (Mexico)
21st-century Mexican politicians
People from Tapachula
Universidad Iberoamericana alumni
Alumni of the University of Warwick
Senators of the LXII and LXIII Legislatures of Mexico